Roger Proudlock (1920–2003) was a British film producer associated with Vandyke Productions, which specialised in making low-budget second features during the late 1940s and 1950s.

He attended Eton College and later served during the Second World War. In 1947 he founded Vandyke with his younger brother Nigel.

Filmography
 The Hangman Waits (1947)
 Death in the Hand (1948)
 Panic at Madame Tussaud's (1948)
 The Strangers Came (1949)
 A Matter of Murder (1949)
 The Six Men (1951)
 Smart Alec (1951)
 Two on the Tiles (1951)
 Four Days (1951)
 Song of Paris (1952)
 The Second Mrs. Tanqueray (1952)
 Strange Stories (1953)
 Black 13 (1953)
 Adventure in the Hopfields (1954)
 Time Is My Enemy (1954)
 Dead on Time (1955)
 They Can't Hang Me (1955)
 Light Fingers (1957)
 The Spaniard's Curse (1958)
 Just Joe (1960)
 Not a Hope in Hell (1960)

References

Bibliography 
 Chibnall, Steve & McFarlane, Brian. The British 'B' Film. Palgrave MacMillan, 2009.

External links 
 

1920 births
2003 deaths
British film producers